This is a list of official national capitals by latitude, including territories and dependencies, non-sovereign states including associated states and entities whose sovereignty is disputed. Sovereign states are shown in bold text.

See also 

 List of capital cities by elevation
 List of national capitals by population
 List of national capitals by area

Footnotes

References

Capitals, National
Latitude
National capitals